The Hans India is an Indian English-language daily newspaper published in the states of Andhra Pradesh and Telangana as well as in New Delhi. The newspaper was started on 15 July 2011 and belongs to Hyderabad Media House Ltd., which also owns Telugu-language news channel HMTV. The chief editor is V. Ramu Sarma.

The Hans India is a part of Kapil Group, promoted by K. Vaman Rao. Kapil Group is a business conglomerate of over 30 companies whose first company, Kapil Chit Funds was started in 1981.

Name 
The name of the newspaper – The Hans India – has been derived from the word 'Hans', meaning swan in Hindi.

K. Ramachandra Murthy, MD and CEO of Hyderabad Media House at the time, noted, “We chose the swan as the symbol for HMTV and also named our paper after this bird as it has the ability to separate milk from water. In the same way, we aim to separate truth from untruth and fact from fiction.” The paper has the tagline 'Free, Frank, and Fearless'.

History 
Hyderabad Media House Ltd. which operated the Telugu news channel HMTV, expanded into print media with the launch of The Hans India, an English-language daily newspaper. The newspaper was started on 15 July 2011.

K. Ramachandra Murthy, MD and CEO of Hyderabad Media House at the time, mentioned that the programme, 'Andhra Dasa Disa' on HMTV gave them the confidence to venture into print media. PNV Nair, who earlier worked as the Editor at Deccan Chronicle, was the first Editor of Hans India.

Hans India started with its primary focus on Andhra Pradesh (which included Telangana) apart from national and global news. It was launched with five editions from Hyderabad, Visakhapatnam, Vijayawada, Warangal, and Tirupati. Later, it also added editions from Amaravati, Khammam, Kurnool, and New Delhi.

Ownership 
The Hans India is owned by Kapil Group, promoted by K. Vaman Rao. Kapil Group is a conglomerate of over 30 companies having presence in over 16 business activities.

Kapil Chit Funds, the first company of the group started in 1981 at Karimnagar by K. Vaman Rao, a Chartered Accountant by profession. It later diversified into sectors like construction, property management, hospitality, manufacturing, media, energy, agriculture, healthcare, finance, IT.

Content 
Hans India publishes 20 pages of news, views, reviews, and information about the nation, world, technology, business, sports, and entertainment. At its launch, the newspaper had regular columns by journalists like Kuldip Nayar, M. V. Kamath, Nilotpal Basu, George Verghese, and Pallavi Ghosh.

The paper was launched with two supplements – Hyderabad Hans and Sunday Hans. Hyderabad Hans is a city-centric four-page pullout, printed everyday. Sunday Hans is an eight-page pullout with features about food fests, travel, counseling etc. It has one page each in the main paper dedicated to education, health, and property.

References

External links
 Official site
 Epaper

English-language newspapers published in India
Newspapers published in Hyderabad
Daily newspapers published in India
Publications established in 2011
2011 establishments in Andhra Pradesh
Newspapers published in Vijayawada